Maestre de campo was a rank created in 1534 by the Emperor Carlos V, inferior in rank only to the capitán general and acted as a chief of staff.  He was chosen by the monarch in the Council of State, and commanded a tercio.  Their powers were similar to those of the old marshals of the Kingdom of Castile: he had the power to administer justice and to regulate the food supply.  His personal guard consisted of eight German halberdiers, paid by the king, who accompanied him everywhere.  Immediately inferior in the chain of command was the sargento mayor.  One of the most famous maestre de campo was Julian Romero, a common soldier who reached the rank of maestre de campo and that brought victory to the Spanish tercios in the battles of San Quintín and Gravelines.

In the overseas colonies of the Spanish Empire a governor held the rank of capitán general over his local forces and would appoint his maestre de campo.

Notable Maestres de Campo

See also 
 Captain general
 Sargento mayor
 Tercio

References

Military ranks
16th-century establishments in Spain